The Ladykillers is a 2011 stage adaptation written by Graham Linehan based on the 1955 Ealing comedy film of the same name. The play premièred at the Liverpool Playhouse in November 2011, directed by Sean Foley. It then transferred to the Gielgud Theatre in London, opening on 7 December 2011 (after previews from 26 November 2011), and closed after a successful and extended run on 14 April 2012. The production, with a different cast, then embarked on a UK national tour from September to December 2012. The play returned to Ealing in March 2017, when it was performed at The Questors Theatre, located less than 500 metres from Ealing Studios, where the original 1955 film was shot. The play had its North American premiere at the Shaw Festival in Niagara-on-the-Lake, Ontario, Canada in June 2019 with Damien Atkins as Professor Marcus and Chick Reid as Mrs. Wilberforce.

Key cast

References

English plays
2011 plays
West End plays
Plays based on films
Comedy plays